Britney: The Videos is the third video album by American recording artist Britney Spears. It was released on DVD on November 20, 2001 through Jive Records. The video brought a collection of Spears' videos as she promoted her then-latest studio album Britney (2001).

The video album managed to enter the top 10 in the UK top 50 music videos chart list.

Synopsis
Britney: The Videos is a collection of videos to promote the counterpart album Britney. It features video clips of songs from the album as well as live performances — including her 2001 MTV Video Music Awards performance — and the trailer for her film Crossroads (2002). It features a sneak peek of her much anticipated Live from Las Vegas concert, which was originally broadcast by HBO.

Track listing

Notes
 "Anticipating" was used in "Britney Strikes a Pose" for background music and "Let Me Be" was used in the credits after "The Making of the Movie Crossroads", and also included a photo gallery; however, it was not listed on the track listing.
 Subtitles available in English, Spanish, Portuguese, French, German and Japanese.

Certifications

References

Britney Spears video albums
Britney Spears live albums
2001 live albums
2001 video albums
Live video albums
Jive Records live albums
Jive Records video albums